Colin Gibson may refer to:

 Colin Gibson (footballer, born 1960), English football fullback or midfielder
 Colin Gibson (footballer, born 1923) (1923–1992), English football forward
 Colin Gibson (musician) (born 1949), bass player and composer
 Colin Gibson (production designer), Australian production designer
 Colin W. G. Gibson (1891–1974), Canadian politician, land surveyor and lawyer
 Colin D. Gibson (1922–2002), Canadian lawyer and politician